Lost in Your Love may refer to:
"Lost in Your Love" (Redlight song), 2012
"Lost in Your Love" (John Paul Young song), 1978
"Lost in Your Love" (Tony Hadley song), 1992
"Lost in Your Love", song by Bee Gees from Mr. Natural
"Lost in Your Love", song by R. Kelly from [[Love Letter (R. Kelly album)|Love Letter]]
"Lost in Your Love", song by Lila McCann from Complete
"Lost in Your Love", song by The Isley Brothers from Tracks of Life
"Lost in Your Love", song by Carly Simon from Letters Never Sent
"Lost in Your Love", song by Gary Moore from A Different Beat
"Lost In Your Love", song by Tyler Woods from The Mahogany Experiment released by It's a Wonderful World Music Group
"Lost in Your Love", song by 1940s jazz singer Arcesia
Lost in Your Love (album), the European title for John Paul Young's album Love Is in the Air